The 2002 Maryland gubernatorial election was held on November 5, 2002. Democratic Governor Parris Glendening was term-limited and could not seek a third term. Republican Bob Ehrlich defeated Democrat Kathleen Kennedy Townsend, making him the first Republican governor of Maryland since Spiro Agnew in 1966. This was the last time Charles County voted Republican for any office.

This election marked the first time since the 1934 gubernatorial election that a Republican won Maryland without Baltimore City or Montgomery County.

Democratic primary

Candidates
Robert Fustero, perennial candidate
Kathleen Kennedy Townsend, lieutenant governor

Results

Republican primary

Candidates
Bob Ehrlich, U.S. Representative
Ross Z. Pierpont, perennial candidate
James J. Sheridan

Results

General election
Lieutenant Governor Kathleen Kennedy Townsend won the Democratic nomination, and Congressman Bob Ehrlich won the Republican nomination, both over token opposition.
     
Ehrlich chose Maryland Republican Party Chairman Michael Steele as his running mate, while Townsend chose Admiral Charles R. Larson as her running mate. Larson switched to the Democratic Party just a few weeks before the election.

Kennedy's selection of Larson as her running mate proved to be an unpopular move, seeing as he was a white former Republican and had been selected without consultation with black Democratic leaders. Ehrlich ran advertisements assailing incumbent Governor Parris Glendening for the increasingly dismal fiscal situation in Maryland, an issue that resonated with Maryland voters. Glendening's unpopularity did little to help his Lieutenant Governor's flailing campaign.

Predictions

Polling

Results

Notes

References 

Maryland
2002
Gubernatorial